This article contains information about the literary events and publications of 1662.

Events
February 15 – The first performance of Sir William Davenant's The Law Against Lovers – the first Restoration adaptation of Shakespeare, consisting of an amalgam of Measure for Measure and Much Ado About Nothing – is given by the Duke's Company at its new theater in Lincoln's Inn Fields, London.
September 29 – Samuel Pepys in his diary calls the King's Company production of A Midsummer Night's Dream in London "the most insipid, ridiculous play that ever I saw in my life."
October 18 – John Ogilby, Master of the Revels in Ireland, opens the first Theatre Royal, Dublin, in Smock Alley.
December 26 – The première of Molière's comedy The School for Wives (L'École des femmes) is held at the Théâtre du Palais-Royal (rue Saint-Honoré) in Paris.
unknown dates
Two autos sacramentales by Pedro Calderón de la Barca – Las órdenes militares and Mística y real Babilonia – are the subject of an inquiry by the Spanish Inquisition. The former is censured and its manuscript copies confiscated, and remains condemned until 1671.
The Parliament of England passes the first Printing Act of the Restoration era, the Licensing of the Press Act, which restricts London printing to a total of 24 printing houses, each with no more than three presses and three apprentices. Books printed abroad are banned. Roger L'Estrange is granted a warrant to seize seditious books or pamphlets.

New books

Prose
Church of England – 1662 Book of Common Prayer
Sarah Blackborow – The Oppressed Prisoners' Complaint
Margaret Cavendish – Orations of Diverse Persons
Cyrano de Bergerac (posthumous) – États et Empires du Soleil (The States and Empires of the Sun)
Franciscus van den Enden – Kort Verhael van Nieuw-Nederland (Brief Account of New Netherland)
John Evelyn – Sculptura: or The history, and art of chalcography and engraving in copper...
Thomas Fuller – The History of the Worthies of England
John Heydon
The Harmony of the World
The English Physician's Guide
Adam Olearius – The Voyages & Travels of the Ambassadors (translated by John Davies, of Kidwelly)

Drama
Margaret Cavendish – Plays Written by the Thrice Noble, Illustrious and Excellent Princess, the Lady Marchioness of Newcastle (closet dramas)
Aston Cockayne – The Tragedy of Ovid published
Pierre Corneille – Sertorius
Sir William Davenant – The Law Against Lovers
William Heminges – The Jews' Tragedy published
Robert Howard – The Committee
Francis Kirkman (probable compiler) – The Wits, or Sport for Sport (collection of drolleries)
Thomas Middleton and John Webster – Anything for a Quiet Life published
Molière – The School for Wives
John Wilson – The Cheats

Poetry
Joost van den Vondel – Joannes de Boetgezant
Michael Wigglesworth – The Day of Doom, or A Poetical Description of the Great and Last Judgement

Births
January 27 – Richard Bentley, English classicist (died 1742)
October 18 – Matthew Henry, English Bible commentator (died 1714)
Baptized December 17 – Samuel Wesley, English poet and author (died 1735)
unknown date – John Hudson, English classicist and librarian (died 1719)

Deaths
March 10 – Samuel Hartlib, German-born English polymath (born 1600)
March 30 – François le Métel de Boisrobert, French poet (born 1592)
May – Daniel de Priézac, French political writer (born 1590)
August 17 – Richard Hubberthorne, English Quaker preacher and writer (born 1628)
August 19 – Blaise Pascal, French philosopher (born 1623)
unknown date – Henry Jeanes, English controversialist and pamphleteer (born 1611)

References

 
Years of the 17th century in literature